Progress M-02M, identified by NASA as Progress 33P, was a Progress spacecraft which was used to resupply the International Space Station during 2009. It was the second Progress-M 11F615A60 spacecraft, and had the serial number 402.

Launch
Progress M-02M was launched by a Soyuz-U carrier rocket, flying from Site 1/5 at the Baikonur Cosmodrome. The launch occurred at 18:37 UTC on 7 May 2009.

Docking
Docking with the Pirs module of the ISS occurred at 19:24 UTC on 12 May 2009. On 30 June 2009, it undocked from the Station to begin a series of scientific experiments, having first been loaded with cargo for disposal, including two Orlan-M spacesuits. It subsequently performed a second rendezvous with the ISS on 12 July 2009 to test docking systems installed for the arrival of Mini-Research Module 2. Following this test, it backed away from the station. At 15:43 UTC on 13 July 2009 it performed its deorbit burn, and it burned up in the atmosphere over the Pacific Ocean at 16:28:47 UTC.

See also

 List of Progress flights
 Uncrewed spaceflights to the International Space Station

References

Spacecraft launched in 2009
Progress (spacecraft) missions
Spacecraft which reentered in 2009
Supply vehicles for the International Space Station
Spacecraft launched by Soyuz-U rockets